Namibia Power Corporation, commonly known as NamPower, is the national electric power utility company of Namibia. The company is responsible for generation, transmission and distribution of electricity in the country. Its activities are licensed, supervised and regulated by the Electricity Control Board (ECB) of Namibia.

Location
The company headquarters are located at NamPower Centre, 15 Luther Street, Windhoek, Khomas Region, Namibia. The geographical coordinates of the company headquarters are 22°33'17.0"S, 17°05'07.0"E (Latitude:-22.554722; Longitude:17.085278).

History
NamPower was founded in 1964 as the South West Africa Water and Electricity Corporation (SWAWEK) by the government of South Africa. SWAWEK was introduced as a company of the Industrial Development Corporation (IDC) of the Republic of South Africa. The early history of the company revolves around the Kunene River hydroelectric project. In 1996, several years after Namibia's Independence, the company was renamed NamPower.

Operations
NamPower operates 3 major electricity generating facilities:
 Ruacana Hydroelectric Power Station, a hydroelectricity power plant on the Kunene River at Ruacana at the Angolan border, with installed capacity of 347 megawatts
 Van Eck Power Station, a thermal facility located in Windhoek, powered by coal, with installed capacity of 120 megawatts
 Anixas Thermal Power Station in Walvisbay, powered by diesel, with generation capacity of 22.5 megawatts. 
There is also one standby diesel power station in Walvisbay, Paratus Thermal Plant, with 18 megawatts.

Renewable Energy Projects
NamPower conducted a pre-feasibility study on the bush-to-electricity concept. The concept foresees the utilisation of excess woody biomass, of which the country possesses an estimated 200 million tonnes due to bush encroachment. Bush encroachment is the growth of bushes and trees at the expense of grass and is caused by overgrazing and climate change. In 2015 NamPower initiated the feasibility study on bush-to-electricity and formed a dedicated biomass project unit. Results and an investment decision are expected for late 2016. A 20 megawatts biomass power plant requires an annual supply of 150,000 tonnes of chipped biomass, which can be supplied from within a  radius in many regions of Namibia due to high bush densities (10 tonnes/ha).

See also
 List of power stations in Namibia

References

External links
 
 Article on NamPowe's Bush-to-Electricity Investment in the Namibian Economist
 

Electric power companies of Namibia
Companies based in Windhoek
1964 establishments in South West Africa
Public utilities established in 1964